Bùi Văn Hiếu (born 2 October 1989) is a Vietnamese footballer who plays as a midfielder for V.League 1 club Bình Định and the Vietnam national football team.

References 

1989 births
Living people
Sportspeople from Hanoi
Vietnamese footballers
Association football midfielders
V.League 1 players
Hanoi FC players
Vietnam international footballers
Than Quang Ninh FC players
Footballers at the 2010 Asian Games
Asian Games competitors for Vietnam